Stewart Reuben (born 1939) is a British chess player, organiser, arbiter and author. He has also been a professional poker player, been called "one of Britain's foremost poker players" and "one of the best two or three players in England", and written several books on the topic.

Chess career
Reuben has officiated at and/or organised a number of high-level chess events held in Britain and elsewhere, including the world chess championship, and was chief organiser of British Chess Championship Congresses for a number of years. He was the chairman of the British Chess Federation  from 1996 to 1999, and is currently Manager of Senior Chess for the English Chess Federation. As of 2006, he is chairman of the FIDE Organisers' Committee and a member of other FIDE committees. He holds the FIDE International Arbiter and FIDE International Organizer titles.

Reuben is a FIDE Candidate Master. During the 1993 World Chess Championship Match between Kasparov and Short, he provided some of the live commentary for the audience at the Savoy theatre.

Author
Reuben has written several books on chess including Chess Openings: Your Choice! and The Chess Organiser's Handbook. He is also the author of several books on poker, including How Good is your Pot-Limit Omaha, How Good is your Pot Limit Hold'Em?, Poker 24/7: 35 years as a Poker Pro, and Starting Out in Poker. Reuben also co-authored Pot-Limit and No-limit Poker with Bob Ciaffone, which Mason Malmuth called "the best information ever put out on these games". His teaching book Play Like a Pro was translated into French as Jouez comme les pros in 2007, and then recommended by the French travel guide publisher Petit Futé for French visitors to Las Vegas.

Books
Chess
The Chess Scene (1974) Faber  (with David Levy)
Chess Openings: Your Choice! (1995) Cadogan Books 
The Chess Organiser's Handbook (1998 1st edition) Everyman Chess ; (2001 new edition) 
London 1980: Phillips and Drew Kings Chess Tournament (2010) Ishi Press  (with William Hartston)
Poker
Pot-Limit & No-Limit Poker (1999 2nd edition)  (with Bob Ciaffone)
Starting Out in Poker (2001) Everyman Chess 
How Good is Your Pot-Limit Omaha? (2004) D&B Publishing 
How Good is Your Pot Limit Hold'em? (2004) D&B Publishing 
An Introduction to Poker (2005) Parragon Publishing 
Poker 24/7: 35 Years as a Poker Pro (2005) D&B Publishing

Notable games
Stewart Reuben vs Robert James Fischer, New York blitz 1963, English Opening: Anglo-Indian Defense (A16), ½–½
Stewart Reuben vs David Bronstein, London Menchik-mem 1994, English Opening: Agincourt Defense (A13), ½–½

References

External links
 
 

1939 births
Living people
British chess players
English poker players
British non-fiction writers
British chess writers
Chess arbiters
British male writers
Male non-fiction writers